The Roman Catholic Diocese of Catamarca is in Argentina and is a suffragan of the Archdiocese of Salta.

History
On 21 January 1910, Saint Pius X established the Diocese of Catamarca from the Diocese of Tucumán.  It lost territory to the Territorial Prelature of Cafayate when it was created in 1969.

Ordinaries
Bernabé Piedrabuena (1910–1923), appointed Bishop of Tucumán
Inocencio Dávila y Matos (1927–1930)
Vicente Peira (1932–1934)
Carlos Francisco Hanlon, C.P. (1934–1959)
Adolfo Servando Tortolo (1960–1962), appointed Archbishop of Paraná
Alfonso Pedro Torres Farías, O.P. (1962–1988)
Elmer Osmar Ramón Miani (1989–2007)
Luis Urbanč (since 2007)

Territorial losses

References

Roman Catholic dioceses in Argentina
Roman Catholic Ecclesiastical Province of Salta
Christian organizations established in 1910
Roman Catholic dioceses and prelatures established in the 20th century
1910 establishments in Argentina